The Raigad Ropeway is a ropeway which provides passenger transportation to Raigad fort.
Raigad fort, which is located in the Indian state of Maharashtra, is considered as the capital of national resistance and the final resting place of the great founder of the Indian liberation – Chatrapati Shivaji. It is a place of national importance and attracts pilgrims of all ages. Prior to the ropeway the only way to ascend Raigad fort was to trek to it, which took an hour. The Ropeway makes this site relatively more accessible to those not in a physical condition to make this trek. The Raigad Ropeway project is a non-profit endeavour, being the only one of its kind in India. This facility is owned by the Shri Shivaji Raigad Smarak Mandal, (SSRSM) Pune an organisation started by Bal Gangadhar Tilak in 1886. Construction of this Ropeway was completed in 1996.

History
In 1990, the SSRSM was permitted by the government of Maharashtra to construct a ropeway at Raigad fort. An offer of Rupees Eighty Million, received from a Central Government firm, from Naini, Allahabad, was considered to be unviable. Subsequently Jog Engineering Limited offered to execute the project on a Build - Operate - Transfer basis in 1994, at a cost of Rupees 31 Million, and the same was accepted by SSRSM .

Salient features of the project
The construction work commenced in November 1994, and was completed by March 1996. The project was inaugurated by the late Prof. Rajendra Singh, Sarsanghchalak of the Rashtriya Swayamsevak Sangh. The ascent is 420 m and the rope length is 760 m. The motor capacity is 52.22 kW and the cabin weight is 100 kg each.

Ropeway Museum
The project includes a museum which was created by Babasaheb Purandare and Ninad Bedekar.

Photographs

See also
 Aerial lift in India

References

External links
 Maharashtra tourism

Aerial tramways in India
Transport in Raigad district
Tourism in Maharashtra
1996 establishments in Maharashtra